James Aggrey Bob Orengo is a Kenyan lawyer, a well known human rights activist and politician who is the current governor for Siaya County. He is also one of the few Kenyan lawyers who have attained the professional grade of Senior counsel in the legal field, a title that he earned under former president Mwai Kibaki.

Orengo was elected as an MP for the Ugenya Constituency as a KANU candidate in a by-election in 1980, making him the youngest MP in Kenya at the time, at age 29. He was elected as a member of parliament for Ugenya constituency in 1992 and served up to 1997, and again in 1997; thereafter he served until 2002. In 2002, he vied for the presidency and lost. In 2005, he joined the Orange Democratic Movement party, teaming up with Raila Odinga after a significant stand-off between the two following a fallout from 2002. In 2007, he vied for the position of Ugenya MP, which he won, enabling him to serve in that capacity until 2013. He was appointed as a Minister of Lands from 2008 to 2013. He was elected and has served in the Senate of Kenya since 2013 as senator for Siaya County.

In 2022 he vied for the governor of Siaya County and won.

Early life and education
He was born James Aggrey Bob Orengo in 1941 in Kasipul Kabondo in Homabay County, Kenya Colony to Apolo Stefano Olunga Orengo, a senior police chief and Josfina Atieno Olunga Orengo. In 1944, he started attending Ambira Primary School, where he finished his primary education in 1964. He joined the Alliance High School in January 1955, and finished form six education in 1970. In 1971, he joined the University of Nairobi to study law. He became the university president in 1973. In 1974, he graduated from the University of Nairobi with a lower second class honors in Bachelor of Laws LL.B, and later enrolled at the prestigious Kenya School of Law, and subsequently passed his bar examination after several attempts and thus admitted into the Kenya legal Council.

Life as an activist

Orengo has been known as a political activist since his days as a student leader at the university. He led fellow students in many protests fighting against issues that he felt needed changing both at the university level and at the national level. He was also among the most prominent critics and activists against the single-party regime. Alongside Raila and other notable politicians, Orengo agitated for multiparty democracy, a new constitution, and free and fair elections, among other issues of public interest.

Orengo says that being an activist has not always been easy and sometimes he had to flee the country for his own good. He was exiled in Tanzania, Uganda and Zimbabwe in the early 1980s to escape the repressive Kanu regime.

An attempted coup against Tanzania's President Julius Nyerere in 1964 would come back to haunt Orengo in the early 1980s. He was repatriated alongside Kenya Air Force soldiers who had tried to oust President Moi in 1982 in a swap with Tanzanian soldiers who had escaped to Kenya. He describes the journey from Namanga to Naivasha prison in a police lorry as a harrowing experience. He was kept in Kamiti and Naivasha's maximum prisons. At some point, he shared the cell with the 1982 attempted coup leader Hezekiah Ochuka. "It was a journey to hell. We were beaten and subjected to all manner of abuse. You were expected to keep your head between your legs throughout the entire harrowing journey", he recalls.

For his constant agitation, the government decreed he would not be allowed to undertake his pupilage in Nairobi after completing his law degree. He ended up in Kericho. However, even when he was away from the capital, his activism was felt at the State House. He was instrumental in organizing countrywide demonstrations in the wake of politician J.M. Kariuki's brutal murder in 1975.

Reforms and multi-party democracy
Orengo became well known for his fight against the unjust rule and spent several years in detention as a result. He was, together with six other MPs, part of the Seven Bearded Sisters. Orengo along with Michael Kijana Wamalwa, Kiraitu Murungi, Raila Odinga, Paul Muite were among the Young Turks who along with Jaramogi Oginga Odinga, Masinde Muliro and Martin Shikuku brought about what was termed as Kenya's second liberation. They formed the formidable Forum for the Restoration of Democracy(FORD), a vehicle that nearly pushed KANU the ruling party out of power in the 1992 general election. He is a founding member of Muungano wa Mageuzi (Movement for Change), a cross-party lobby group.

Political career

Orengo was elected as an MP for Ugenya Constituency as a KANU candidate in a by-election in 1980. He became the youngest MP, at age 29. He was subsequently elected as an MP in December 1992 on a FORD-Kenya ticket. He was re-elected in December 1997 on a Ford-Kenya ticket but lost his seat in the 2002 general elections when he also contested for the Presidency on a Social Democratic Party ticket.

Orengo ran for the presidency in 2002 for the Social Democratic Party(SDP), but finished fourth with just 0.4% of the votes. His party lost all of its parliamentary places, as many SDP's leading figures had joined the NARC coalition.

As of 2007, he was still the SDP chairman. The party supported Raila Odinga of Orange Democratic Movement at the 2007 general elections. In the 2007 elections Orengo won the Ugenya Parliamentary seat on an ODM ticket. He had been out of parliament since the 2002 elections after losing the seat to Archbishop Stephen Ondiek.

During the post-election crisis, Orengo served as one of four spokesmen for the Orange Democratic Movement in its attempts to settle its dispute with the Party of National Unity following the disputed presidential elections in Kenya in 2007.

Orengo was sworn in as a Minister for Lands in the new Coalition Government formed by the National Accord Act of 2008. This is his first stint as a cabinet minister.

Orengo revealed the sale of the Grand Regency hotel at 2.7 billion Kenyan shillings (approximately €30 million EUR). He announced the transfer of ownership from the Central Bank of Kenya to the new Libyan owners had taken place under the direction of Amos Kimunya, finance minister. This set off the Grand Regency Scandal.

Orengo was sworn in during 2013 as the senator for Siaya County. In 2017, he was re-elected as a senator in the same county. In 2018, he was chosen by his party leader Raila Amollo Odinga to replace Moses Wetangula as the minority leader in the Kenyan Senate. In 2019, Orengo was appointed by President Uhuru Kenyatta and Raila Odinga as part of the task force team to implement Building Bridge Initiative (BBI) 
On 9 August 2022 General Election, He won the Siaya Governor Seat with ODM party under Azimio la Umoja one Coalition.

Personal life
He is married to lawyer Betty Murungi.

See also 
 Luo people of Kenya and Tanzania

References

External links 

Living people
Members of the Senate of Kenya
20th-century Kenyan lawyers
Orange Democratic Movement politicians
Kenyan democracy activists
Forum for the Restoration of Democracy politicians
Forum for the Restoration of Democracy – Kenya politicians
Members of the National Assembly (Kenya)
Alumni of Alliance High School (Kenya)
Prisoners and detainees of Kenya
University of Nairobi alumni
Kenya School of Law alumni
1951 births
Candidates for President of Kenya